Jonathan Guilmette (born August 18, 1978 in Montreal, Quebec) is a Canadian short track speed skater who won silver in the 5000m relay at the 2006 Winter Olympics in Turin. At the 2002 Winter Olympics in Salt Lake, he won Gold in the 5000m relay and silver in the 500m.

Jonathan Guilmette currently works at the Olympic Oval in Calgary, AB.

External links
 
 Jonathan Guilmette on Real Champions
Jonathan Guilmette at ISU

1978 births
Living people
Canadian male short track speed skaters
Olympic gold medalists for Canada
Olympic silver medalists for Canada
Olympic short track speed skaters of Canada
Olympic medalists in short track speed skating
Short track speed skaters at the 2002 Winter Olympics
Short track speed skaters at the 2006 Winter Olympics
Medalists at the 2006 Winter Olympics
Medalists at the 2002 Winter Olympics
Speed skaters from Montreal
World Short Track Speed Skating Championships medalists
21st-century Canadian people